Erosida lineola is a species of beetle in the family Cerambycidae. It was described by Johan Christian Fabricius in 1781.

References

Eburiini
Beetles described in 1781